Ermita del Cerro de los Mártires is a church located in San Fernando in the Province of Cádiz, Andalusia, Spain.

Churches in San Fernando, Cádiz